UEFA Champions League 2006–2007 is the official video game of the 2006–07 season of the UEFA Champions League. Developed by EA Canada, it is published by Electronic Arts worldwide under the EA Sports label. It was released on 20 March 2007 in North America, 22 March in Australia, and 23 March in Europe.

This was the last game by EA Sports to include the Champions League until FIFA 19 over eleven years later. Konami held the Champions League license in the interim, with the competition featuring in all its Pro Evolution Soccer games from Pro Evolution Soccer 2009 to Pro Evolution Soccer 2018.

Overview
UEFA Champions League 2006–2007 was developed with the same engine used in FIFA 07, with slight graphical and gameplay adjustments, as well as the option to play a new manager mode named The Treble. The in-game commentators are Clive Tyldesley and Andy Townsend. Ultimate Team was introduced for the first time on the Xbox 360 version.

References

External links
 Interview with Matt Holme, UEFA Champions League 06-07 Producer
 UEFA Champions League Sizzle

2006–07 UEFA Champions League
2007 video games
EA Sports games
Esports games
Association football video games
PlayStation 2 games
PlayStation Portable games
Video games developed in Canada
Windows games
Xbox 360 games
Multiplayer and single-player video games